Daniel Jiménez (born April 14, 1988) is a Belizean professional forward currently playing for Belmopan Bandits.

International career

International goals
Scores and results list Belize's goal tally first.

References

External links
 
 

1988 births
Belize international footballers
Belizean footballers
Living people
Premier League of Belize players
2011 Copa Centroamericana players
2013 CONCACAF Gold Cup players
2014 Copa Centroamericana players
2017 Copa Centroamericana players
Association football forwards
Belmopan Bandits players
Police United FC (Belize) players
Verdes FC players
Belize Defence Force FC players
Belize under-20 international footballers
Belize youth international footballers
People from Benque Viejo del Carmen